Under False Flag may refer to:

 Under False Flag (1932 film), a German cloak-and-dagger film
 Under False Flag (1935 film), a Swedish comedy film